Gassensensationen is a theatre festival in Germany.

Theatre festivals in Germany